Zerbanoo Gifford is a British writer and human rights campaigner. She is president of the World Zoroastrian Organisation. She founded the ASHA foundation and centre, a charity working for the enrichment of young adults, ethical leadership, social innovation, sustainable living, intercultural and interfaith understanding, and the performing arts.

Charitable work 
Gifford is a philathropist and holds the International Woman of the Year Award 2006 for her humanitarian work, which spans over 50 years of grassroots and global activism. She has been a director of Anti-Slavery International and of the Charities Aid Foundation. She is founder of the ASHA Foundation and the ASHA Centre in the Forest of Dean.

Politics 

In 1982 Gifford made history by being elected as a councillor for Harrow, the first female Asian councillor to be elected for the Liberal Party. She has stood three times for Parliament, Hertsmere in 1983 (Liberal/SDP Alliance) and 1992 (Liberal Democrat), and Harrow East (Liberal/SDP Alliance) in 1987. By standing in 1983, she became one of the first three Asian women to stand for Parliament along with Rita Austin (Labour, St Albans) and Pramila Le Hunte (Conservative, Birmingham Ladywood).

In 1986 she chaired the Liberal "Commission of Inquiry into Ethnic Minority Involvement in the Liberal Party". Gifford was twice elected by the party's membership the Liberal Democrats' Federal Executive, the first ethnic minority person to be elected to a major UK party's supreme body. She was a member of the Race Relations Forum set up in 1998 by then Home Secretary, Jack Straw.

In 1992 Gifford co-chaired the centenary celebrations for the election of the first non-white MP, Dadabhai Naoroji.

Recognition 
Gifford received the Nehru Centenary Award in 1989. She was nominated for the Women of Europe Award in 1991. She was awarded the Freedom of the city of Lincoln, Nebraska, USA for combating modern slavery and racism. In 2007, Zerbanoo received the International Splendor award in Hollywood, for her lifetime achievements in the field of equality and human rights. In 2010, to celebrate the 90th anniversery of American Suffrage she was honoured by the Sewall-Belmont museum in Washington DC in an exhibition commemorating key global women who have advanced women's rights. A biography of her by New-Zealand editor Farida Master, Zerbanoo Gifford: An Uncensored Life, was published in 2015 by Harper Collins. Gifford was one of the seven former pupils who featured in Roedean school's 125 anniversary celebrations.

Publications 

Gifford's written works include:
The Golden Thread: Asian Experiences of Post-Raj Britain, 1990 
Dadabhai Naoroji, Britain's First Asian MP, 1992
The Asian Presence in Europe, 1995  
Thomas Clarkson and the Campaign against Slavery, 1996
Foreword to  Race and British Electoral Politics, 1998 
Celebrating India, 1998
South Asian Funding in the UK, 1999 
Confessions to a Serial Womaniser: Secrets of the World's Inspirational Women, 2007
Z to A of Zoroastrianism 2022: Ancient Wisdom for Modern Living, 2022

References

Living people
People educated at Roedean School, East Sussex
British politicians of Indian descent
Indian Zoroastrians
Indian emigrants to England
English people of Parsi descent
English Zoroastrians
English activists
Alumni of the Open University
British Zoroastrians
1950 births